At  the Raßberg is one of the highest mountains in the Eifel region on the German and Belgian border. It lies within the municipality of Arft in the collective municipality of Vordereifel within sight of the Eifel's highest peak, the Hohe Acht.

Walking 
Walkers and naturalists are drawn to its juniper heaths. It is accessible to the public via the Juniper Trail (Wacholderwanderweg), which runs for 15 km through the protected juniper reserve of the East Eifel.

History 
There are good views from its largely unforested plateau, on which there is a US steel lattice mast. This was the previous location of Arft Radio Relay station (AFCC designation Adenau) maintained by the Air Force Communications Command now Air Force Network Integration Center and United States Air Force Europe USAFE. Arft was an unmanned microwave relay station linking the 2139th Communication Squadron at Prum Air Station and various points in Germany.

References 

Mountains and hills of the Eifel
Mountains and hills of Rhineland-Palatinate
Mountains under 1000 metres